Titus Gebel (born 1967 in Würzburg) is a German entrepreneur, lawyer, political activist and publicist. He is the former CEO of Deutsche Rohstoff AG and Managing Director of Rhein Petroleum GmbH.

Life 
Gebel earned his doctorate at the University of Heidelberg at the Max Planck Institute for Comparative Public Law and International Law. He then worked as a manager for various companies in the biotechnology, venture capital and commodities industry.

In 2006 he founded Deutsche Rohstoff AG with Thomas Gutschlag and served as CEO until 2014. The company initially participated in exploration and development projects and later built its own production, primarily in Australia and the US (gold, silver, tungsten, molybdenum, petroleum, natural gas). The company has been listed on the Frankfurt Stock Exchange since 2010 and generated an annual turnover of 108 million euros in 2018. Rhein Petroleum GmbH was founded in 2007 to put oilfields in southern Germany back into operation and began production in 2018.

Free private cities 
In his 2018 book Free Private Cities, Gebel modified the Paul Romer's Charter City concept, which has so far found no implementation. This leads Gebel back to the unwillingness of states to allow administrative officials of a third state to fulfill sovereign tasks in their own territory.

Instead, in a so-called free private city, a private company offers residents protection of life, liberty, and property in a demarcated area as "government service providers". This service includes security and rescue services, a legal and regulatory framework and independent dispute resolution. The residents pay a contractually fixed amount for these services per year. The public service provider as operator of the community can not unilaterally change the contract later. The so-called contract citizens have a legal claim that is respected and a claim for damages in case of poor performance by the private city. Disputes between them and the government service provider are brought before independent arbitration tribunals, as is customary in international commercial law. If the operator ignores the arbitration award or misuses its power in another way, its customers leave and the operator goes bankrupt.

Gebel is currently working with partners to realize the world's first Free Private Cities, including Honduras among others. The concept has been discussed in a positive way in the media landscape, but also criticized as neocolonialist.

Publications 

 Der Treuhandgedanke und die Bewahrung der biologischen Vielfalt. Pro Universitate, Berlin 1998, .
 Free Private Cities: Making Governments Compete For You. Aquila Urbis, Walldorf 2018, .

Literature 

 Christoph Seidler: Deutschlands verborgene Rohstoffe: Kupfer, Gold und Seltene Erden Auszug in: Spiegel Online vom 27. August 2012. Carl Hanser Verlag, München 2012. .
 Thomas Fuster: Leben ohne staatliche Gängelung. In: Neue Zürcher Zeitung. 25. Juni 2017.
 Malte Fischer und Jan Guldner: Wenn das Leben ohne Staat möglich wird In: Wirtschaftswoche. 17. Dezember 2017.
 René Scheu: Unsere Smartphones verbessern wir ständig In: Neue Zürcher Zeitung. 6. November 2018.

References

External links 

 Free Private Cities website

1967 births
German opinion journalists
German activists
German libertarians
German chief executives
Heidelberg University alumni
Living people